The 2015–16 Honduran Cup was the 11th staging of the Honduran Cup and the second edition as Copa Presidente.  Olimpia were the defending champions.  The cup was a creation of the Honduran government funded by money allocated to national security fund.  Its purpose was to support the growth of sport to detract the youth from vices and to promote national tourism for rural towns.

The cup was contested by 64 teams from the top 3 divisions of the country.  There was a total of 10 teams from Liga Nacional (1st division), 27 from Liga de Ascenso (2nd division) and 27 from Liga Mayor (3rd division).  It was the first time in which the tournament covered two calendar years.

Juticalpa F.C. obtained its first title after defeating Real C.D. España in the final match.

Participants
 Liga Nacional

 Honduras Progreso (El Progreso, Yoro)
 Juticalpa (Juticalpa, Olancho)
 Marathón (San Pedro Sula, Cortés)
 Motagua (Tegucigalpa, Francisco Morazán)
 Olimpia (Tegucigalpa, Francisco Morazán)

 Platense (Puerto Cortés, Cortés)
 Real España (San Pedro Sula, Cortés)
 Real Sociedad (Tocoa, Colón)
 Victoria (La Ceiba, Atlántida)
 Vida (La Ceiba, Atlántida)

 Liga de Ascenso

 Liga Mayor

Schedule and format
The first round started on 7 October 2015 and the final is scheduled to be held on 23 July 2016.

Prize fund

Round of 64

Round of 32

Round of 16

Quarterfinals

1st legs

2nd legs

Semifinals

1st legs

2nd legs

Third place match

Final

Controversy
Juticalpa F.C. and Real C.D. España qualified to the tournament's final after defeating C.D. Real Sociedad and Club Deportivo Olimpia respectively.  The final match was scheduled to be played by the end of May.  After Juticalpa and Real España were eliminated from the league, both teams decided to postpone the match until July and sent their players on vacations.  By the middle of July, both teams had released and acquired new players for the upcoming season.  The cup organizers released a statement disclosing that the clubs couldn't use the new signed players as these weren't initially registered at the beginning of the tournament.  Consequently, Juticalpa announced that they would not show to the game claiming that they were short on players.  A day later, the tournament's committee gave up at the pressure and finally announced that the clubs could use the new signings.

References

Honduran Cup seasons
Cup